Nanda Nagar  is a village development committee in Kapilvastu District in the Lumbini Zone of southern Nepal. At the time of the 1991 Nepal census it had a population of 4740 people living in 808 individual households.

References

Populated places in Kapilvastu District